Sebastian Schedel (1570–1628) was a German painter and illustrator best known for his contributions to the Hortus Eystettensis. A few of the original drawings for the Hortus Eystettensis are preserved at Kew in a codex called Schedel’s Calendarium.

Family Schedel
The name Schedel was a respected one in Germany in the 15th century. Sebastian was the great-grandson of Hartmann Schedel (1440-1514), German historian, physician, humanist, and one of the first cartographers to make use of the printing press. He was also the grandson of Sebastian Schedel (1494 Nuremberg - 1541 Hersbruck) and Barbara Pfinzing (1492 Nuremberg - 1528 Nuremberg), and son of Melchior Schedel (1516 Nuremberg - 1571 Nuremberg). Melchior was little interested in his grandfather's library, and ignored his express will that the books be kept together. He sold the library for 500 guilders in 1552 to the Augsburg merchant Johann Jakob Fugger (1516–1575). Fugger, in need of money, sold it two decades later to the Bavarian Duke Albrecht V.

References

External links
Nuremberg Chronicle

Botanical illustrators